Oho! was a Finnish weekly entertainment and women's magazine published in Helsinki, Finland, between 2002 and 2009.

History and profile
Oho! was started by the Danish company Aller in 2002. The magazine was also published by the company.  It was partially a competitor to the similar 7 päivää magazine published by same publisher.

Target audience of Oho! was 18- to 30-year-old women. The editor-in-chief of the magazine was Eeva-Helena Jokitaipale who also served as the editor-in-chief of 7 päivää.

In March 2009 Oho! ceased publication.

References

2002 establishments in Finland
2009 disestablishments in Finland
Defunct magazines published in Finland
Entertainment magazines
Finnish-language magazines
Magazines established in 2002
Magazines disestablished in 2009
Magazines published in Helsinki
Weekly magazines published in Finland
Women's magazines published in Finland